Keep Christmas with You is an album recorded during the Mormon Tabernacle Choir's 2014 Christmas shows in the LDS Conference Center, with special guests actor Santino Fontana (Frozen'''s Hans) and The Muppets from Sesame Street''. The album and concert DVD were released on October 16, 2015. The recorded concert premiered on PBS on December 21, 2015.

DVD Menu

References

2015 Christmas albums
Christmas albums by American artists
Tabernacle Choir albums
Sesame Street albums